The Men's Cross-Country event at the 2010 South American Games was held at 11:30 on March 23.

Medalists

Results
Race distance: 43 km (10 laps)

References
Report

Cross Country M
2010 in mountain biking